Bernhard Mayr is a German curler.

At the national level, he is a two-time German men's champion curler (1992, 1993).

Since 2015 he works as a President of German Curling Association.

Teams

References

External links

Living people

German male curlers
German curling champions
Sportspeople from Bavaria
Year of birth missing (living people)